The Rockville Bridge spans the east fork of the Virgin River in Rockville, Utah, United States. The bridge was built for the National Park Service in 1924 to provide a link between Zion National Park and the North Rim area of Grand Canyon National Park. The new bridge allowed motorists to take a circular tour of the national parks in southern Utah and northern Arizona. The Rockville route was superseded in 1928 by the construction of the Zion-Mount Carmel Highway.

The bridge was designed by the U.S. Bureau of Public Roads for the Park Service, fabricated by the Minneapolis Steel and Machinery Company, and erected by Ogden contractor C. F. Dinsmore. The bridge spans  in a single span, using a steel twelve-panel Parker through-truss.

The Rockville Bridge was placed on the National Register of Historic Places in 1995.

See also
List of bridges documented by the Historic American Engineering Record in Utah
List of bridges on the National Register of Historic Places in Utah

References

External links

The Rockville Bridge

Bridges completed in 1924
Buildings and structures in Washington County, Utah
Road bridges on the National Register of Historic Places in Utah
Historic American Engineering Record in Utah
Transportation in Washington County, Utah
1924 establishments in Utah
National Register of Historic Places in Washington County, Utah
Steel bridges in the United States
Parker truss bridges in the United States